Yusuf Mohamed Ismail "Bari-Bari" (born 15 July 1958 – died 27 March 2015) was a Somali diplomat and politician. He was the Ambassador of Somalia to the United Nations Human Rights Office in Geneva.

Personal life
Ismail was born in 1960 in Rome, Italy to an aristocratic Somali family. He belonged to the Majeerteen Harti Darod clan. His family originally hailed from Garowe, the administrative capital of the northeastern Puntland regional state of Somalia.

For his tertiary education, Ismail earned a degree in political science from the University of Bologna.

Career
Professionally, Ismail joined the diplomatic service. He was appointed Ambassador of Somalia to the United Nations Human Rights Office in Geneva, Switzerland in 2008. In this capacity, Ismail worked to promote and protect human rights in his country of origin and around the world. Through his work with civil society groups, he is credited with having helped to establish the Council's Independent Expert on Albinism, a global panel that was formed in 2015.

On 27 March 2015, Ismail sustained injuries during an attack on Hotel Makka al-Mukarama in Mogadishu by the Al-Shabaab militant group. He later succumbed to the wounds at the hospital.

President of Somalia Hassan Sheikh Mohamud, Puntland President Abdiweli Mohamed Ali, former Puntland President Abdirahman Farole, and UN Special Representative for Somalia Nicholas Kay all sent their condolences to the slain diplomat's family. The United Nations Human Rights Council also observed a minute of silence in honour of Ismail. President of the Council Ambassador Joachim Rücker described Ismail as a widely admired and respected leadership figure, whose commitment to global human rights left a tangible impact.

On 29 March, a state funeral for Ambassador Ismail was held in Garowe. The funeral service was attended by Puntland President Ali and various Federal Government of Somalia delegates.

References

External links
Official webpage at somaligov.net

2015 deaths
Ambassadors of Somalia to Switzerland
Permanent Representatives of Somalia to the United Nations
Somalian diplomats
Somalian murder victims
Somalian Muslims
Somalian politicians
People from Garowe
University of Bologna alumni
1958 births